Georgetown is a small settlement close to the south bank of the Waitaki River in the South Island of New Zealand.

The first sections in the area were sold in 1870. The location was named for former Otago Provincial Treasurer George Duncan.

The area around Georgetown is noted for the presence of early Māori rock paintings, and the discovery of many moa remains.

References

Populated places in Otago
Waitaki District